Reaction Motors Rocket Test Facility, is located in Franklin Lakes, Bergen County, New Jersey, United States. The facility was built in 1942 and was added to the National Register of Historic Places on June 6, 1979.

See also
National Register of Historic Places listings in Bergen County, New Jersey

References

Franklin Lakes, New Jersey
Industrial buildings completed in 1942
Buildings and structures in Bergen County, New Jersey
National Register of Historic Places in Bergen County, New Jersey
World War II on the National Register of Historic Places
New Jersey Register of Historic Places
1942 establishments in New Jersey